How Ace Are Buildings is the debut album by British alternative rock band A, released in 1997.

The album was re-released in 1998, in cassette and Limited Edition 12" formats. Whereas the cassette featured the same tracks, the 12" album also included a bonus disc, featuring A remixes and live tracks.

The vinyl edition was limited to 500 copies.

Track listing
 "Turn It Up" – 1:33
 "Foghorn" – 3:04
 "Cheeky Monkey" – 3:36
 "Number One" – 3:50
 "Bad Idea" – 2:21
 "Sing-A-Long" – 4:20
 "Winter of '96" – 5:28
 "Out of Tune" – 4:19
 "Fistral" – 3:59
 "House Under the Ground" – 4:01
 "Five in the Morning" – 3:14
 "Ender" – 18:07
 Contains a hidden track at 14:49

"Number One" features a portion of lyrics taken from Billy Joel's 1978 track "My Life". Joel was name-checked in the credits as a result. The "borrowed" lyrics are:

"Got a call from an old friend, used to be real close
Said he couldn't go on the American way
Sold his house, sold his car
Bought a ticket to the West Coast
Now he gives 'em a stand-up routine in L.A."

"Cheeky Monkey" features a sample of the actor/comedian John Thomson using the phrase "oh, you cheeky monkey" - this is taken from Thomson's appearance on Knowing Me, Knowing You... with Alan Partridge in character as Joe Beesley, an inept ventriloquist with a puppet monkey.

Bonus vinyl Track listing

 "Turn It Down"
 "Number One (Happy Valley Ranch Mix)"
 "Alright (Live)"
 "Bad Idea (Live)"
 "Sing-A-Long (Post Term Audit Mix)"
 "Five in the Morning (DJ Mental Visuals Mix)"
 "Foghorn (Live)"
 "Barnyard"
 "Demolished House" (b-side to foghorn, also remix of House Under The Ground)
 "Callhimin"
 "Cheeky Monkey (Live)"
 "Fistral (Major Threat Mix)"
 "Out of Tune" (Live)

Singles 
Five in the Morning (TYCD 1)
 "Five in the Morning" - 3:13
 "8 Fingers" - 2:26
 "Almost Everything Is Great" - 5:29

House Under The Ground (TYCD 2)
 "House Under The Ground" - 4:01
 "40" - 2:30
 "Demolished House" - 5:22

Bad Idea (TYCD 3)
 "Bad Idea" – 2:16
 "Look What You Made Me Do" – 3:12
 "40" – 2:30

Number One (TYCD 4)
 "Number One (Radio Edit)" - 3:22
 "Alright" - 2:41
 "Ouch!" - 4:00
 "Number One" - 3:50

Foghorn (TYCD 5)
 "Foghorn" – 3:07
 "Last Girl" – 4:24
 "A Demolished House" – 5:22

Number One
CD1　(TYCD 6):
 "Number One" – 3:21
 "Good Idea" – 2:18
 "Alright" – 2:41
 "Sasquatch" – 2:52

CD2 (TYCDP 6):
 "Number One" – 3:51 (+30)
 "Ouch" – 4:02
 "Number One" – 6:15 (Happy Valley Ranch Mix)
 "Foghorn" – 3:06
 "Foghorn" (Video)

Sing-A-Long
CD1 (TYCD 7):
 "Sing-A-Long (Radio Edit)" - 3:41
 "I'm Over It" - 1:47
 "Callhimin" - 5:02
 "Photo Finger" - 3:58

CD2 (TYCDP 7):
 "Sing-A-Long" – 4:19
 "Sing-A-Long" – 4:22 (Post Team Audit Mix)
 "Singing Out of Tune" – 3:49 (In A Castle)
 "Number One" – 3:22 (Radio Edit)
 "Number One" (Video)

References

A (band) albums
1997 debut albums